Censorinus was a Roman grammarian and writer of the 3rd century AD.

Censorinus may also refer to:

 Censorinus (died 53 BC), friend and contemporary of Publius Crassus
 Several ancient Romans of the gens Marcia; see Marcius Censorinus
 Censorinus (usurper), a fictional usurper against Roman Emperor Claudius II (c. 269 AD)
 Censorinus (crater), on the Moon